Bethel is an unincorporated community along State Highway 7 in Comanche County, Oklahoma, United States, located east of Lawton.

References

Unincorporated communities in Comanche County, Oklahoma
Unincorporated communities in Oklahoma